Insulivitrina reticulata is a species of gastropod in the Vitrinidae family. It is endemic to Spain.

Sources

Endemic fauna of the Canary Islands
Fauna of Spain
Insulivitrina
Endemic fauna of Spain
Gastropods described in 1872
Taxonomy articles created by Polbot
Taxobox binomials not recognized by IUCN